A café is a small restaurant or coffeehouse.

A cafe is a small, cheap eatery or diner, sometimes called a "greasy spoon".
Diner - or "coffee shop" (USA)
Cafe (British) - or "transport cafe" (UK)

A cafe is a privately owned convenience store in South Africa. 

Cafe or café may also refer to:

Acronym 
CAFE may refer to:

 CAFE Foundation ("Comparative Aircraft Flight Efficiency"), a U.S. non-profit aviation development and flight test
 Canadian Association for Free Expression
 Canadian Association for Equality
 
 Corporate Average Fuel Economy, a U.S. standard for minimum fuel efficiency in vehicles

Art, entertainment, and media

Television 
 The Cafe (2004 talk show), a 2004–2010 Irish talk show that aired on RTÉ Two
 The Café (2011 talk show), a 2011 Al Jazeera English talk show
 The Café (New Zealand TV program), a 2016 New Zealand morning television program that airs on Three
 The Café (UK TV series), a 2011–2013 British television comedy series about a fictional cafe in the seaside town of Weston-super-Mare, United Kingdom that aired on Sky1
 "The Cafe" (Seinfeld), an episode of an American TV show

Other art, entertainment, and media
 Café (2010 film), an American film
 Café (2014 film), a Mexican documentary
 Project Cafe, the unconfirmed codename of Nintendo's eighth generation console, Wii U
 Café: A Collection of Literary Sketches, a book by Japanese author Novala Takemoto
 Café (magazine), a men's fashion magazine in Sweden

Other uses
 Cafe (plant genus), a former genus in the family Rubiaceae; a synonym for Coffea
 @Cafe, a former New York City based Internet café
 CAFE (media company), a media company
 Café (musician), a Brazilian percussionist, singer, and composer, real name Edson Aparecido da Silva

See also 
 CAF (disambiguation)
 Cafeteria, a type of restaurant, usually self-serve
 Caffè, a term for Italian coffee
Coffee the word café exists in many romance languages
 Coffee shop (disambiguation)
 Coffeehouse (disambiguation)